Sietze Haarsma (22 June 1926 – 21 December 2017) was a Dutch rower. He competed in the men's coxless four event at the 1948 Summer Olympics.

References

1926 births
2017 deaths
Dutch male rowers
Olympic rowers of the Netherlands
Rowers at the 1948 Summer Olympics
Sportspeople from Zwolle